Costonia is a genus of trilobites in the family Trinucleidae. The species C. elegans is from the Ordovician of South Shropshire, England.

See also 
 List of trilobite genera

References

External links 

 
 
 Costonia at insectoid.info

Trinucleidae
Asaphida genera